Habib Ali Zain al-Abidin al-Jifri (born 16 April 1971) is a Yemeni-born Sunni and Sufi Islamic scholar and spiritual educator located in the United Arab Emirates. He is the founder of Tabah Foundation (مؤسسة طابـة), a research institute based in Abu Dhabi, UAE.

Early life
Ali Zain al-Abidin al-Jifri was born in the city of Jeddah, Saudi Arabia, on 16 April 1971 (20th Safar 1391 AH). Al-Jifri is a direct descendant of the Islamic prophet Muhammad through his grandson Imam Husayn. His lineage is recorded as follows: He is Ali bin Abd al-Rahman, bin Ali, bin Muhammad, bin Alawi, bin Ali, bin Alawi, bin Ali, bin Ahmad, bin Alawi, bin Abd al-Rahman Mawla al-Arshah, bin Muhammad, bin Abd Allah al-Tarisi, bin Alawi al-Khawas, bin Abu Bakr al-Jifri, bin Muhammad, bin Ali, bin Muhammad, bin Ahmad, bin Muhammad al-Faqih al-Muqaddam, bin Ali, bin Muhammad Sahib al-Mirbat, bin Ali Khali Qasam, bin Alawi al-Thani, bin Muhammad Sahib al-Sawma'ah, bin Alawi al-Awwal, bin Ubayd Allah, bin Ahmad al-Muhajir, bin Isa al-Rumi, bin Muhammad al-Naqib, bin Ali al-Uraydi, bin Ja'far al-Sadiq, bin Muhammad al-Baqir, bin Ali Zayn al-Abidin, bin Husayn, bin Ali bin Abi Talib and Fatimah al-Zahra, the daughter of Muhammad. He has written a number of articles and books including "The Concept of Faith in Islam."

Awards and recognition
In 2009, Al-Jifri was listed 37th in the world's 500 most influential Muslims by Georgetown University's Prince Alwaleed Bin Talal Center for Muslim-Christian Understanding and Royal Islamic Strategic Studies Centre of Jordan. He has since moved up on the list throughout the years, currently holding the number 24 spot. He was a recipient of the Eugen Biser award in 2008 for his contribution to the document A Common Word Between Us and You.

Controversial beliefs 
‎Al-Jafri strongly believes that his Prophet Muhammad had taken his hand out of the grave to shake Ahmad al-Rifaʽi's hand (a typical belief by Sufism). He also accuses anyone (including non religious) not believing this can happen to have mental problems.

In another statement on Yemen Today TV channel, he emphasizes that part of Khums (20% of a Muslim's wealth) to be paid for them. He also attacks the Aqyal movement (Those who believe in and call for Yemeni nationalism), describes them as extremists.

See also
Sheikh Abubakr Ahmad
Ba'Alawi
Sunnism
 2016 international conference on Sunni Islam in Grozny

References

External links 
Official Website

Asharis
Shafi'is
Yemeni Sunni Muslim scholars of Islam
Yemeni imams
Hashemite people
Living people
1971 births
20th-century Yemeni people